Adyghe Autonomous Oblast was an autonomous oblast within Krasnodar Krai, Soviet Union.  It existed from 1922 to 1991.

Cherkess (Adyghe) Autonomous Oblast was established within the Russian SFSR on July 27, 1922, on the territories of Kuban-Black Sea Oblast primarily settled by the Adyghe people. At that time, Krasnodar was the administrative center.  It was renamed Adyghe (Cherkess) Autonomous Oblast on August 24, 1922, soon after its creation.  On October 24, 1924, it became part of new North Caucasus Krai.  It was renamed Adyghe Autonomous Oblast in July 1928.  On January 10, 1934, the autonomous oblast became part of new Azov-Black Sea Krai, which was spun off North Caucasus Krai.  The city of Maykop and surrounding areas were added to the Adyghe AO and Maykop designated the administrative center of the autonomous oblast in 1936.  Adyghe AO became part of Krasnodar Krai when it was established on September 13, 1937.

On April 28, 1962, the district of Tula, Krasnodar Krai, was added to the Adyghe AO and the autonomous region became its present form.

On July 3, 1991, the autonomous oblast was elevated to the status of a republic under the jurisdiction of the Russian Federation and renamed Republic of Adygea.

See also
First Secretary of the Adyghe Communist Party

Autonomous oblasts of the Soviet Union
States and territories established in 1922
States and territories disestablished in 1991
Politics of the Republic of Adygea
1922 establishments in Russia
1991 disestablishments in the Soviet Union
History of Adygea